The South Shore Regional Centre for Education (SSRCE) is the public school board responsible for the administration of elementary, junior high, and high school education in Lunenburg County and Queens County in Nova Scotia, Canada.
The South Shore Regional Centre for Education was established on August 1, 2004 by an Act of the provincial legislature.

Enrollments
As of 2020 the school board had an enrollment of over 12,886 students enrolled in elementary, junior and senior schools.

Controversies

Religious discrimination
On May 3, 2012, the Board drew attention to itself in the Canadian media for allowing a student from Forest Heights Community School to be suspended by the school's principal for wearing a T-shirt that had the words, "Life is wasted without Jesus" on it, drawing criticism that it was discriminating against Christians and violating the boy's Charter rights to freedom of expression and religion. The T-shirt was an expression of the scriptural passage from the St. Paul's Letter to the Philippians 3:8, which says, "More than that, I even consider everything as a loss because of the supreme good of knowing Christ Jesus my Lord. For his sake I have accepted the loss of all things and I consider them so much rubbish, that I may gain Christ....".

On May 4, 2012, the South Shore Regional School Board decided to allow the boy to return to school on the following Monday and gave him permission to wear the shirt at school. They also hired a facilitator to deal with the issue; however, reports by CTV News indicated that the boy was not sure he wanted to return to school, feeling both discriminated against by administrators and bullied.

Verbal attack on hearing impaired student
In 2018 Fred Forsyth, a teacher of the Bayview Community School, repeatedly verbally attacked Amy Bennett, a hearing impaired student of the same school, after she went to the bathroom for a prolonged time. Accusing her of skipping classes, he yelled at her for a couple of minutes. The parents of Amy Bennett claimed that the incident caused permanent damage to her ears due to the fact that her hearing aid magnifies certain noises and caused a permanent tinnitus. The incident escalated up to Education Minister Zach Churchill, who made a public statement condemning the teacher for his behavior while denying to meet neither the student nor her parents. Despite a nine month long investigation of the accident, there was no public statement made regarding the disciplinary actions against the teacher to protect the privacy of the teacher.

Schools

Lunenburg County

Aspotogan Elementary, pr. to 5, Mill Cove
Bayview Community School, pr. to 9, Mahone Bay
Big Tancook Elementary, pr. to 5, Tancook Island
Bluenose Academy, pr. to 9 Lunenburg
Bridgewater Elementary, pr. to 6, Bridgewater
Bridgewater Junior High, 7 to 9, Bridgewater
Centre Consolidated, pr. to 9, Lunenburg (closed 2012)
Chester Area Middle School (CAMS), 6 to 8, Chester
Chester District Elementary, pr. to 5, Chester
Forest Heights Community School, 9 to 12, Chester Basin
Gold River-Western Shore Elementary, pr. to 5, Western Shore (closed in 2013)
Hebbville Academy, pr. to 9, Hebbville
New Germany Elementary, pr. to 6, New Germany
New Germany Rural High School, 7 to 12, New Germany
New Ross Consolidated, pr. to 8, New Ross
Newcombville Elementary, pr. to 4, Newcombville
Park View Education Centre, 10 to 12, Bridgewater
Pentz Elementary, pr. to 6, Pentz
Petite Rivière Elementary, pr. to 6, Petite Rivière
Riverport District Elementary, pr. to 6, Riverport (closed September 2011)
West Northfield Elementary, pr. to 6, Bridgewater

Adult & Alternative Education Programs
Bridgewater Adult High School, (NSCC Lunenburg Campus), Bridgewater
Queens County Adult Program, (Rossignol Centre), Bridgewater
Mahone Bay Centre (Junior/Senior Alternate Programs), Mahone Bay

Queens County
Dr. John C. Wickwire Academy, pr. to 5, Liverpool
Greenfield Elementary, pr. to 6, Caledonia
Liverpool Regional High School, 9 to 12, Liverpool
Mill Village Elementary, pr. to 6, Mill Village - (closed)
Milton Centennial, pr. to 2, Milton - (closed)
North Queens Elementary, pr. to 6, Caledonia (Destroyed by fire September 14, 2006 - re-opened 2008)
North Queens High, 7 to 12, Caledonia
South Queens Junior High, 6 to 8, Liverpool

See also
List of Nova Scotia schools
Education in Canada

References

External links
South Shore Regional School Board website

Bridgewater, Nova Scotia
School districts in Nova Scotia
Education in Lunenburg County, Nova Scotia
Education in the Region of Queens Municipality